Hari-varman (Gupta script:  Ha-ri-va-rmmā) was the founder of the Maukhari dynasty. He is the first ruler to be named in the known Maukhari records.

Biography
Hari-varman was the founder of the Maukhari dynasty. He is the first ruler to be named in the known Maukhari records. He or one of his immediate ancestors probably moved westwards towards Kannauj during the decline of the Guptas. He only bore the title of Maharaja, unlike the other Maukhari rulers who had pompous titles. The Haraha inscription gives him the epithet of Jvalamukha (fire-faced).  

The Asirgadh seal of Sarva-varman Maukhari says that- (There was) the illustrious Mahârâja Harivarman, whose fame stretched out beyond the four oceans; who had other kings brought into subjection by (his) prowess and by affection (for him); who was like (the god) Chakradhara, in employing (his) sovereignty for regulating the different castes and stages of religious life; (and) who was the remover of the afflictions of (his) subjects. His son, who meditated on his feet, (was) the illustrious Mahârâja Âdityavarman, begotten on the Bhattârikâ and Dêvî Jayasvâminî.

Succession
He was succeeded by his son Adityavarman onto the Maukhari throne.

See also
Maukhari dynasty
Gupta Empire
Vardhana dynasty

References

6th-century Indian monarchs